The 1992–93 División de Honor de Fútbol Femenino was the 5th season of the Spanish women's football first division. Oroquieta Villaverde won its first title.

Teams and locations

League table and results

References

1992-93
Spa
1
women